The 2011 Colorado State Rams football team represented Colorado State University in the 2011 NCAA Division I FBS football season. The Rams were led by fourth year head coach Steve Fairchild and played their home games at Sonny Lubick Field at Hughes Stadium. They are members of the Mountain West Conference. They finished the season 3–9, 1–6 in Mountain West play to finish in a three-way tie for sixth place.

Head coach Steve Fairchild was fired at end of the season after four year record of 16–33.

Schedule

References

Colorado State
Colorado State Rams football seasons
Colorado State Rams football